Edward Erving Lake (March 18, 1916 – June 7, 1995), nicknamed "Sparky," was an American professional baseball player from 1937 through 1956. A shortstop, he appeared in 835 games in the Major Leagues over 11 seasons with the St. Louis Cardinals (1939–1941), Boston Red Sox (1943–1945), and Detroit Tigers (1946–1950).

Over his MLB career, Lake compiled only a .231 batting average, but with his ability to draw bases on balls, Lake had a career on-base percentage of .366 — 135 points higher than his batting average. His  on-base percentage of .412 with the Red Sox led the American League. Lake had over 100 bases on balls in three consecutive seasons. He was also four best in the AL in times hit by pitcher in 1946 with four.

Lake was also a solid fielder, leading AL shortstops in assists and double plays in 1945.  For the 1945 season, Lake collected 265 putouts, 459 assists, and 112 double plays.  His range factor was 5.57 — 63 points above the league average for shortstops. Traded by the Red Sox to the Tigers on January 3, 1946 for first baseman Rudy York, Lake scored 105 runs in his first season for the Tigers in 1946, while York helped lead Boston to its first American League pennant in 28 years.

He is interred at Holy Sepulchre Cemetery in Hayward, California.

References

External links

 SABR biography

1916 births
1995 deaths
Baseball players from Oakland, California
Boston Red Sox players
Burials in Alameda County, California
Decatur Commodores players
Detroit Tigers players
Detroit Tigers scouts
Grand Island Red Birds players
Houston Buffaloes players
Major League Baseball shortstops
Minnesota Twins scouts
Oakland Oaks (baseball) players
People from Antioch, California
Sacramento Solons players
Saint Mary's Gaels baseball coaches
St. Louis Cardinals players
Salinas Packers players
San Francisco Seals (baseball) players
Spokane Indians managers
Victoria Tyees players
Washington Senators (1901–60) scouts